Zeleno Polje is a settlement in the region of Baranja, Croatia. Administratively, it is located in the Petlovac municipality within the Osijek-Baranja County. Population is 43 people.

History

Zeleno Polje has existed as part of the settlement from 1948. It was formally established as an independent settlement in 1991, when it was separated from the territory of Petlovac.

Population

Ethnic composition, 1991. census

References

Literature

 Book: "Narodnosni i vjerski sastav stanovništva Hrvatske, 1880–1991: po naseljima, author: Jakov Gelo, izdavač: Državni zavod za statistiku Republike Hrvatske, 1998., ;

See also
Osijek-Baranja county
Baranja

Populated places in Osijek-Baranja County
Baranya (region)